William Quirke (c.1896 – 5 March 1955) was an Irish Fianna Fáil politician and a senior revolutionary figure in County Tipperary during the Irish War of Independence.

Early life 
Born in Clonmel, he was educated at Rockwell College, County Tipperary. During the Irish War of Independence he served with the Tipperary Brigade of the Irish Republican Army (IRA) as an Intelligence Officer. He became Commanding Officer of the Second Southern Division and was arrested and interned on Spike Island but escaped. He opposed the Anglo-Irish Treaty and fought with the Anti-Treaty IRA forces. During the Irish Civil War he issued a Proclamation that if any member of his Command was executed he would have an equivalent number of leading Free State citizens executed as a result. None were executed by the Government forces as a result. At the 1923 general election he was an unsuccessful Sinn Féin candidate in the Tipperary constituency.

After the end of the Civil War, Quirke left Ireland and went to the United States, Canada and Mexico where he held a variety of different jobs including a ranchman, builders' labourer, lumberjack and cowpuncher. While in Los Angeles, California he married Clare Riordan in January 1928. The couple then returned to Ireland where Quirke joined the newly formed Fianna Fáil party. He was one of seven successful Fianna Fáil candidates who secured election to Free State Seanad at the 1931 Seanad election, securing a nine-year term. He was a member of the Seanad until its abolition in 1936.

Political career 
From 1938 onwards, he was re-elected by the Agricultural Panel to the new Seanad Éireann In the upper house he was the Fianna Fáil Leader of the Seanad and chief spokesperson. He was also a vice-president of Fianna Fáil. When the party was in opposition he acted as Leader of the Opposition in the Seanad. A farmer, he was also a partner of Stokes and Quirke, an auctioneering firm with offices in Dublin, Clonmel, Fethard and London and was for a time a director with the Agricultural Credit Corporation and Butlin's Irish Associates. When the Turf Development Board was created in 1934 Quirke and Aodogán O'Rahilly were appointed as part-time board members at the request of Todd Andrews. This organisation became Bord na Móna.

In 1947 three gentlemen representing a company called Trans-World retained the services of Stokes and Quirke to buy Locke's whiskey distillery in Kilbeggan, County Westmeath. They managed to secure an appointment to have tea with the President Seán T. O'Kelly, which was photographed, as they appealed for extra time before putting down their initial down payment of IR£75,000. As the weeks passed people became suspicious of their backgrounds and the Minister for Justice, Gerald Boland, ordered an investigation which resulted in their arrests. Two fled the country while the third was put on the mailboat to Holyhead. As there were by-elections in the offing the opposition capitalised on the issue. Oliver J. Flanagan, in particular, made a number of allegations of corruption in the Dáil and the Government under Éamon de Valera set up the Locke Tribunal to investigate the matter. The report was very critical of Flanagan and called him irresponsible but did not find any Fianna Fáil politician guilty of corruption. Nevertheless, the perception remained going into the 1948 general election which benefitted the Clann na Poblachta party.

Death 
Quirke died while on a stag hunt with the Ward Union Hunt on 5 March 1955 while still a Senator. His funeral mass was attended by many former colleagues from the Second Southern Division of the Old IRA and by President O'Kelly, Fianna Fáil Oireachtas and party members, and representatives of the Government parties. He is buried in Deans Grange Cemetery. The resulting by-election to fill the vacancy caused by the death was held on 14 May 1956, and was won by Joe Sheridan of Fine Gael.

References

1890s births
1955 deaths
Irish farmers
Members of the 1931 Seanad
Members of the 1934 Seanad
Members of the 2nd Seanad
Members of the 3rd Seanad
Members of the 4th Seanad
Members of the 5th Seanad
Members of the 6th Seanad
Members of the 7th Seanad
Members of the 8th Seanad
Fianna Fáil senators
Politicians from County Tipperary
Burials at Deans Grange Cemetery
People educated at Rockwell College